Westbury railway station was a station in Westbury, Shropshire, England. The station was opened in 1862 by the Shrewsbury and Welshpool Railway company, later coming under the joint control of the Great Western Railway and the London and North Western Railway. Just a year earlier, the loop was the site of a head-on collision between two passenger trains after one passed a signal at danger. One of the two  Diesel Multiple Units involved was derailed and 37 people were injured.

The former main building survives here in occupation as a private house, along with the now automatic level crossing over the B4387 road.

References

Further reading

Disused railway stations in Shropshire
Railway stations in Great Britain opened in 1862
Railway stations in Great Britain closed in 1960
Former Great Western Railway stations
Former London and North Western Railway stations